This is a list of gymnastics academies in the United States. To be listed, clubs have a strong elite program with elite gymnasts and strong Level 10 gymnasts.



California 
 All Olympia Gymnastics Center – Los Angeles, California and Calabasas, California

Minnesota 
 Twin City Twisters – Champlin, Minnesota

Ohio 
 Cincinnati Gymnastics Academy – Fairfield, Ohio

Pennsylvania 
 Parkettes National Gymnastics Training Center – Allentown, Pennsylvania

Texas 
 Texas Dreams Gymnastics – Coppell, Texas
 World Olympic Gymnastics Academy – Plano, Texas and Frisco, Texas

Gymnastics academies in the United States